The 2014 Denmark Super Series Premier was the ninth super series tournament of the 2014 BWF Super Series. The tournament took place in Odense, Denmark from October 14–19, 2014 and had a total purse of $600,000. A qualification was held to fill four places in all five disciplines of the main draws.

Men's singles

Seeds 

  Lee Chong Wei (Withdraws)
  Chen Long
  Jan Ø. Jørgensen 
  Kenichi Tago
  Tommy Sugiarto
  Wang Zhengming
  Shon Wan-ho
  Hans-Kristian Vittinghus

Top half

Bottom half

Finals

Women's singles

Seeds 

  Li Xuerui 
  Wang Shixian
  Wang Yihan 
  Sung Ji-hyun
  Ratchanok Intanon
  Bae Yeon-ju
  Saina Nehwal

Top half

Bottom half

Finals

Men's doubles

Seeds 

  Lee Yong-dae / Yoo Yeon-seong
  Muhammad Ahsan / Hendra Setiawan
  Mathias Boe / Carsten Mogensen
  Hiroyuki Endo / Kenichi Hayakawa
  Kim Ki-jung / Kim S-r
  Lee Sheng-mu / Tsai Chia-hsin
  Ko Sung-hyun / Shin Baek-cheol
  Marcus Fernaldi Gideon / Markis Kido

Top half

Bottom half

Finals

Women's doubles

Seeds 

  Bao Yixin / Tang Jinhua
  Christinna Pedersen / Kamilla Rytter Juhl
  Misaki Matsutomo / Ayaka Takahashi
  Tian Qing / Zhao Yunlei
  Ma Jin / Tang Yuanting
  Reika Kakiiwa / Miyuki Maeda
  Jang Ye-na / Kim So-young
  Wang Xiaoli / Yu Yang

Top half

Bottom half

Finals

Mixed doubles

Seeds 

  Zhang Nan / Zhao Yunlei
  Joachim Fischer Nielsen / Christinna Pedersen
  Xu Chen / Ma Jin
  Tantowi Ahmad / Liliyana Natsir
  Chris Adcock / Gabby Adcock
  Ko Sung-hyun / Kim Ha-na
  Michael Fuchs / Birgit Michels
  Sudket Prapakamol / Saralee Thoungthongkam

Top half

Bottom half

Finals

References 

Denmark Super Series
Denmark Super Series
Sport in Odense
Denmark Open